Odawara (小田原) may refer to:

Locations
Odawara, a city in Kanagawa Prefecture, Japan
Odawara Castle, a castle in Odawara, Kanagawa Prefecture, Japan
Odawara Domain, a Japanese domain of the Edo period
Odawara-juku, the ninth of the fifty-three stations of the Tōkaidō
Odawara Women's Junior College, a private women's junior college in Odawara Kanagawa Prefecture, Japan
Odawara Campus of Kanto Gakuin University

People
Odawara Hōjō (小田原北条) or Odawara Hōjōshi (小田原北条氏), other names for the Later Hōjō clan (後北条氏)
Takashi Odawara (小田原貴, b. 1992), a Japanese footballer

Transport
Odawara Station, a railway station operated by JR East in Odawara, Kanagawa, Japan
Odakyū Odawara Line, the main railway line run by Odakyu Electric Railway
Odawara-Atsugi Road, a 4-laned toll road in Kanagawa Prefecture, Japan
Home Liner Odawara, a service for commuters on the Tōkaidō Main Line operated by JR East

See also
Siege of Odawara (disambiguation), multiple battles at Odawara Castle